Transurethral biopsy is a biopsy procedure in which a sample of tissue is removed from the prostate for examination under a microscope. A thin, lighted tube is inserted through the urethra into the prostate, and a small piece of tissue is removed with a cutting loop.

References
 Transurethral biopsy entry in the public domain NCI Dictionary of Cancer Terms

Biopsy
Male genital surgery